The 2013 Men's Hockey Asia Cup was the ninth edition of the Men's Hockey Asia Cup, the quadrennial international men's field hockey championship of Asia organized by the Asian Hockey Federation. It was held from 24 August to 1 September 2013 in Ipoh, Perak, Malaysia. The winner of this tournament qualified for the 2014 World Cup in The Hague, Netherlands.

The defending champions South Korea defeated India 4–3 in the final to win their fourth title. Pakistan won the bronze medal by defeating the hosts Malaysia 3–1.

Qualified teams

Results
The schedule was released on August 13, 2013.

All times are (UTC+8).

Pools

Pool A

Pool B

Fifth to eighth place classification

5–8th place semi-finals

Seventh and eighth place

Fifth and sixth place

First to fourth place classification

Semi-finals

Third and fourth place

Final

Statistics

Final standings

Goalscorers

See also
2013 Men's Asian Champions Trophy
2013 Women's Hockey Asia Cup

References

Hockey Asia Cup
Asia Cup
Hockey Asia Cup
International field hockey competitions hosted by Malaysia
Hockey Asia Cup
Hockey Asia Cup
Ipoh
Asia Cup